The Cloisters, also known as Cloisters Castle, is a historic home in Lutherville, Baltimore County, Maryland, United States. The building was completed in 1932, after three years of construction. The house is 4 story house, irregular in elevation and plan with much architectural ornament. It is built of large, random-sized blocks of a native gray and gold colored rock known as Butler stone, with details principally of sandstone, wood from the site, plaster, and wrought iron. The main façade is dominated by two asymmetrically placed, projecting sections topped by massive half-timbered gables which were originally part of a Medieval house in Domrémy, France. It also has a massive stone octagonal stair tower, which contains a stone and wrought-iron spiral staircase and is crowned by a crenellated parapet and a small, round, stone-roofed structure from which one can exit onto the roof of the main tower. The house's roof is constructed of overlapping flagstones secured by iron pins, the only roof of this kind in America.

The property is owned by Baltimore City and operated by the Baltimore Office of Promotion and Arts, although it is located in Baltimore County. The city ran a children's museum in the building until 1996, when it moved to the Inner Harbor area and was renamed "Port Discovery". The Cloisters is currently operated as a rental facility, hosting over 250 weddings, parties, bar/bat mitzvahs, and gatherings per year.

The Cloisters was listed on the National Register of Historic Places in 1979.

In popular culture
On December 31, 1997, about 100 guests attended the wedding of Jada Pinkett Smith and Will Smith at The Cloisters.

References

External links

The Cloisters official website (Managed by Baltimore Office of Promotion & The Arts, 10 E. Baltimore Street, 10th Floor, Baltimore, MD 21202)
The Cloisters (Cloisters Castle) (Baltimore Office of Promotion & The Arts, 10 E. Baltimore Street, 10th Floor, Baltimore, MD 21202)
Cloisters Castle - Event Venue, Historical Place | Facebook
The Cloisters (Cloisters Castle) (Listing on www.dupontcastle.com Directory of U.S. Castles)
Maryland (Scenic) Byways (Brochure) (References to The Cloisters, pp. 72, 74)

Houses in Baltimore County, Maryland
Houses on the National Register of Historic Places in Maryland
Houses completed in 1930
Gothic Revival architecture in Maryland
Lutherville, Maryland
National Register of Historic Places in Baltimore County, Maryland
1930 establishments in Maryland